The 1992 congressional elections in Arizona were elections for Arizona's delegation to the United States House of Representatives, which occurred along with congressional elections nationwide on November 8, 1992. Arizona has six seats, as apportioned during the 1990 United States Census.  Republicans held five seats and Democrats held one seat before the election, but both parties had three seats each after the election because the Democrats gained two seats.

Overview

References

United States House of Representatives
Arizona
1992